Serra de Montejunto Protected Landscape is a protected landscape in the Montejunto-Estrela mountain range, spanning the municipalities of Alenquer and Cadaval in Lisbon District, Portugal. The area is part of the Estremenho Limestone Massif.

Fauna and flora
Serra de Montejunto Protected Landscape is particularly noted for its colony of Miniopterus schreibersi, with a cave in Cadaval being classified as an Important National Bat Roost, with several thousand roosting during the winter months. Flora found in the area include Arabis sadina, Coincya cintrana, Juncus valvatus, Narcissus calcicola and Silene longicilia.

References

Protected landscapes of Portugal
Natura 2000 in Portugal